"Sacrifice" is a song by American singer Bebe Rexha, from her second studio album Better Mistakes. It was released as the second single from the album on March 5, 2021.

Composition 
The song was written by Rexha, Pablo Bowman, Peter Rycroft and the song's producer Burns. It was described by Rexha as Better Mistakes'''s only dance track. Musically, it is a dance-pop song with club-ready beats and deep diving hooks.

 Music video 
The music video, directed by Christian Breslauer, was released on March 5, 2021 during YouTube Originals' Released series. It was inspired by action films from the late 1990s, such as Blade and The Matrix'', and features Rexha as a vampire woman. The video starts with Rexha and her band of vampire women invading a hospital and looting its blood bank. It ends with Rexha dancing in a club where blood rains from above.

Charts

Weekly charts

Year-end charts

Certifications

Release history

References 

2021 singles
2021 songs
Bebe Rexha songs
Songs written by Bebe Rexha
Songs written by Pablo Bowman
Warner Records singles
Songs written by Peter Rycroft